For Heaven's Sake is a comedy written by former Emmy Award winner, Ann Marcus.  The film was directed and produced by Nat Christian.  It stars Florence Henderson, Allison Lange, David Paetkau, Yaani King, Kathryn Gordon, Stephanie Patton, Joseph Campanella and Skyler Gisondo.

The film was released in 2008 by Vanguard Cinema.

References

External links

2008 films
2008 comedy films